Sturla Gudlaugsson (1913 – 1971) was a Danish-born Dutch art historian and director of the RKD and the Mauritshuis in The Hague.

Gudlaugsson was born in Skagen as the son of the Icelandic poet Jonas Gudlaugsson, but his father died when he was three and he grew up in Kleef with his mother's extended Dutch family. He studied in Berlin and worked first there until he felt he needed to leave the Nazi regime and got a job in Denmark. He then worked briefly at the Gemeentelijk museum in The Hague before starting work at the RKD in 1942.

He is best known for his research on Dutch painting iconography, most notably in the works of Jan Steen and Gerard ter Borch.

Gudlaugsson left the RKD to become director of the Mauritshuis in 1970, but he died the next year in Rotterdam.

References

External links 
 record in the RKD
 works in WorldCat
 Gudlaugssons in the Dictionary of Art Historians

1913 births
1971 deaths
People from Skagen
Dutch art historians
Danish emigrants to the Netherlands